Hungary competed at the 1932 Summer Olympics in Los Angeles, United States. 58 competitors, 56 men and 2 women, took part in 39 events in 11 sports.

Medalists

|  style="text-align:left; width:78%; vertical-align:top;"|

Default sort order: Medal, Date, Name

| style="text-align:left; width:22%; vertical-align:top;"|

Multiple medalists
The following competitors won multiple medals at the 1932 Olympic Games.

Athletics

Boxing

Cycling

One male cyclist represented Hungary in 1932.

Individual road race
 Sebestyén Schmidt

Fencing

Ten fencers, eight men and two women, represented Hungary in 1932.

Men's épée
 Tibor Benkő
 Imre Petneházy

Men's sabre
 György Piller-Jekelfalussy
 Endre Kabos
 Attila Petschauer

Men's team sabre
 Attila Petschauer, Ernő Nagy, Gyula Glykais, György Piller-Jekelfalussy, Aladár Gerevich, Endre Kabos

Women's foil
 Erna Bogen-Bogáti
 Margit Danÿ

Gymnastics

Modern pentathlon

Three male pentathletes represented Hungary in 1932.

 Elemér Somfay
 Tibor Benkő
 Imre Petneházy

Shooting

Three shooters represented Hungary in 1932, with Zoltán Soós-Ruszka Hradetzky winning a bronze medal.

50 m rifle, prone

 Zoltán Soós-Ruszka Hradetzky
 Tibor Tary
 Antal Barát-Lemberkovits

Swimming

Water polo

Wrestling

Art competitions

References

Nations at the 1932 Summer Olympics
1932
1932 in Hungarian sport